This is a list of television programs previously broadcast by the American television network NBC.

News programming

1986 (1986)
Camel News Caravan (1949–56)
Early Today (1982–83, original run)
The Huntley–Brinkley Report (1956–70)
Megyn Kelly Today (2017–18)
Monitor (1983)
NBC News at Sunrise (1983–99)
NBC News Overnight (1982–83)
NBC Nightside (1991–98)
Now with Tom Brokaw and Katie Couric (1993–94)
Real Life with Jane Pauley (1990–91)
Rock Center with Brian Williams (2011–13)
Sunday Night with Megyn Kelly (2017)
Weekend (1974–79)

Scripted programming

Sitcoms

100 Questions (2010)
1600 Penn (2012–13)
227 (1985–90)
30 Rock (2006–13)
3rd Rock from the Sun (1996–2001)
90 Bristol Court (1964–65)
A.P. Bio (2018–19) (moved to Peacock)
A.U.S.A. (2003)
A to Z (2014–15)
Abby's (2019)
About a Boy (2014–15)
Accidental Family (1967–68)
The Aldrich Family (1949–53)
ALF (1986–90)
All Is Forgiven (1986)
Almost Home (1993)
Amen (1986–91)
American Dreamer (1990–91)
Andy Barker, P.I. (2007)
Animal Practice (2012)
Ann Jillian (1989–90)
Are You There, Chelsea? (2012)
Baby Boom (1988–89)
Bachelor Father (1959–61)
Bad Judge (2014–15)
Bent (2012) 	
Best Friends Forever (2012)
The Bill Cosby Show (1969–71)
The Bill Dana Show (1963–65)
Blossom (1990–95)
The Bob Crane Show (1975)
The Bob Cummings Show (1955; 1957–59)
Bosom Buddies (1984)
Boss Lady (1952)
Boston Common (1996–97)
The Brian Keith Show (1972–74)
Brooklyn Nine-Nine (2019–21) (moved from Fox)
Brotherly Love (1995–96) (moved to The WB)
Brothers and Sisters (1979)
Buffalo Bill (1983–84)
Built to Last (1997)
C.P.O. Sharkey (1976–78)
Café Americain (1993–94)
California Dreams (1992–96)
Camp Runamuck (1965–66)
Car 54, Where Are You? (1961–63)
The Carmichael Show (2015–17)
Carol & Company (1990–91)
Caroline in the City (1995–99)
Champions (2018)
Cheers (1982–93)
Chicago Sons (1997)
Chico and the Man (1974–78)
Committed (2005)
Community (2009–14) (moved to Yahoo! Screen)
Connecting (2020)
Conrad Bloom (1998)
The Cosby Show (1984–92)
Coupling (2003)
Crowded (2016)
Cursed (2000–01)
DAG (2000–01)
Daddio (2000)
Day by Day (1988–89)
The Days and Nights of Molly Dodd (1987–88) (moved to Lifetime)
Dear John (1988–92)
Dear Phoebe (1954–55)
The Debbie Reynolds Show (1969–70)
Diana (1973–74)
The Dick Van Dyke Show (1967–1976)
A Different World (1987–93)
Diff'rent Strokes (1978–85) (moved to ABC)
Double Trouble  (1984–85)
Down Home (1990–91)
The Duck Factory (1984)
The Dumplings (1975–76)
Easy Street (1986–87)
Emeril (2001)
Empty Nest (1988–95)
Encore! Encore! (1998–99)
Ensign O'Toole (1962–63)
Ethel and Albert (1953–54)
Everything's Relative (1999)
The Facts of Life (1979–88)
Family Ties (1982–89)
The Fanelli Boys (1990–91)
Father Knows Best (1955–58)
Fathers and Sons (1986)
Fay (1975–76)
Ferris Bueller (1990–91)
The Fighting Fitzgeralds (2001)
Fired Up (1997–98)
Flesh 'n' Blood (1991)
For Your Love (1998) (moved to The WB)
Four Kings (2006)
Frasier (1993–2004)
Free Agents (2011)
The Fresh Prince of Bel-Air (1990–96)
Friends (1994–2004)
Friends with Benefits (2011)
From a Bird's Eye View (1971)
Get Smart (1965–69) (moved to CBS)
The Ghost & Mrs. Muir (1968–69) (moved to ABC)
Gimme a Break! (1981–87)
The Girl with Something Extra (1973–74)
Go Fish (2001)
Go On (2012–13)
The Golden Girls (1985–92)
The Good Life (1971–72)
The Good Life (1994)
The Good Place (2016–20)
Good Morning, Miami (2002–03)
Grady (1975–76)
Grand (1990)
Grandpa Goes to Washington (1978–79)
Great News (2017–18)
Growing Up Fisher (2014)
Guys with Kids (2012–13)
Hank (1965–66)
Happy (1960–61)
Happy Family (2003–04)
Harper Valley PTA (1981–82)
Harris Against the World (1964–65)
Harry's Girls (1963–64)
Hazel (1961–65) (moved to CBS)
Hello, Larry (1979–80)
Here and Now (1992–93)
Hey, Landlord (1966–67)
Hidden Hills (2002–03)
Hizzonner  (1979)
The Hogan Family (1986–90) (moved to CBS)
Hope & Gloria (1995–96)
House Rules (1998)
I Dream of Jeannie (1965–70)
I Feel Bad (2018)
I Married Joan (1952–55)
In the House (1995–96) (moved to UPN, then to syndication)
Indebted (2020)
In-Laws (2002–03)
Inside Schwartz (2001–02)
It's Your Move (1984–85)
The Jack Benny Program (1964–65) (moved from CBS)
The Jeff Foxworthy Show (1996–97) (moved from ABC)
Jennifer Slept Here (1983–84)
Jesse (1998–2000)
The Jimmy Stewart Show (1971–72)
Joe & Valerie (1978–79)
Joey (2004–06)
The Joey Bishop Show (1961–64) (moved to CBS)
The John Larroquette Show (1993–96)
Julia (1968–71)
Just Shoot Me! (1997–2003)
The Kallikaks (1977)
Karen (1964–65)
Kath & Kim (2008–09)
Kenan (2021–22)
Kentucky Jones (1964–65)
Kristin (2001)
The Last Precinct (1986)
LateLine (1998–99)
Lewis & Clark (1981–82)
The Life of Riley (1949–50; 1953–58)
Lotsa Luck (1973–74)
Love, Sidney (1981–83)
Love and Marriage (1959–60)
M.Y.O.B. (2000)
Mad About You (1992–99)
Madman of the People (1994–95)
Mama's Boy (1987–88)
Mama's Family (1983–84) (moved to syndication)
Man of the People (1991–92)
Marlon (2017–18)
Marry Me (2014–15)
Mary Kay and Johnny (1948–50)
The Martin Short Show (1994)
The McLean Stevenson Show (1976–77)
Men Behaving Badly (1996–97)
The Michael J. Fox Show (2013–14)
The Michael Richards Show (2000)
The Misadventures of Sheriff Lobo (1979–81)
Miss Match (2003)
Mister Peepers (1952–55)
Mister Roberts (1965–66)
The Mommies (1993–95)
Mona McCluskey (1965–66)
The Monkees (1966–68)
The Montefuscos (1975)
The Mothers-in-Law (1967–69)
Mr. Mayor (2021–22)
Mr. Robinson (2015)
Mr. Smith  (1983)
My Little Margie (1952–53; 1953–55)
My Mother the Car (1965–66)
My Name Is Earl (2005–09)
My Two Dads (1987–90)
My World and Welcome to It (1969–70)
The Naked Truth (1997–98) (moved from ABC)
Nancy (1970–71)
Needles and Pins (1973)
The New Normal (2012–13)
NewsRadio (1995–99)
Night Court (1984–92)
Norby (1955)
Nothing in Common (1987)
Nurses (1991–94)
The Nutt House (1989)
Occasional Wife (1966–67)
The Office (2005–13)
One Big Happy (2015)
One of the Boys (1982)
One of the Boys (1989)
Out All Night (1992–93)
Outsourced (2010–11)
Pacific Station (1991–92)
Parenthood (1990–91)
Parks and Recreation (2009–15)
The Partners (1971–72)
The Paul Reiser Show (2011)
The People's Choice (1955–58)
Perfect Couples (2010–11)
Perfect Harmony (2019–20)
Peter Loves Mary (1960–61)
Please Don't Eat the Daisies (1965–67)
Powerless (2017)
The Powers That Be (1992–93)
The Practice (1976–77)
Pride & Joy (1995)
Punky Brewster (1984–86)
The Pursuit of Happiness (1995)
Quark (1977–78)
Rags to Riches (1987–88)
Rhythm & Blues (1992–93)
RollerGirls (1978)
Roomies (1987)
Sally (1957–58)
Sanford (1980–81)
Sanford and Son (1972–77)
Sanford Arms (1977)
Sara (1985)
Save Me (2013)
Saved by the Bell: The College Years (1993–94)
Scrubs (2001–08) (moved to ABC)
Sean Saves the World (2013–14)
The Second Half (1993–94)
Seinfeld (1989–98)
Silver Spoons (1982–86)
The Single Guy (1995–97)
Sirota's Court (1976–77)
Sister Kate (1989–90)
Someone Like Me (1994)
Something So Right (1996–97) (moved to ABC)
Something Wilder (1994–95)
Spencer (1984–85)
Stanley (1956–57)
Stark Raving Mad (1999–2000)
Suddenly Susan (1996–2000)
Superstore (2015–21)
Sunnyside (2019)
Sweet Surrender (1987)
The Tab Hunter Show (1960–61)
Taxi (1982–83) (moved from ABC)
Teachers (2006)
Telenovela (2015–16)
Three Sisters (2001–02)
Tom, Dick and Mary (1964–65)
The Tony Danza Show (1997)
The Torkelsons (1991–92)
The Tortellis (1987)
The Tracy Morgan Show  (2003–04)
Trial & Error (2017–18)
Truth Be Told (2015)
Tucker (2000–01)
Turnabout (1979)
Twenty Good Years (2006–07)
Undateable (2014–16)
Union Square (1997–98)
United States (1980)
Up All Night (2011–12)
Veronica's Closet (1997–2000)
The Wackiest Ship in the Army (1965–66)
Walter & Emily (1991–92)
Watching Ellie (2002–03)
The Waverly Wonders (1978)
We Got It Made (1983–84)
Welcome to the Family (2013)
Welcome to Sweden (2014–15)
Whitney (2011–13)
Whoopi (2003–04)
Who's Watching the Kids? (1978)
Will & Grace (1998–06; 2017–20)
Wings (1990–97)
Working (1997–99)
Working the Engels (2014)
Working Girl (1990)
Working It Out (1990)
You Again? (1986–87)

Animated series
The Bullwinkle Show (1961–64)
The Famous Adventures of Mr. Magoo (1964–65)
Father of the Pride (2004–05)
The Flintstone Primetime Specials (1980–81)
God, the Devil and Bob (2000)
Jokebook (1982)
Sammy (2000)
Stressed Eric (1998)

Dramas

The 100 Lives of Black Jack Savage (1991)
A.D. The Bible Continues (2015)
The A-Team (1983–87)
Aaron's Way (1988)
Acapulco (1961)
Adam-12 (1968–75)
The Adventures of Sir Lancelot (1956–57)
Against the Grain (1993)
The Alfred Hitchcock Hour (1964–65) (moved from CBS)
Alfred Hitchcock Presents (1960–62) (moved from CBS)
Alfred Hitchcock Presents (1985–86) (moved to USA Network)
Allegiance (2015)
Amazing Stories (1985–87)
American Dreams (2002–05)
American Odyssey (2015)
Armstrong Circle Theatre (1950–57) (moved to CBS)
Awake (2012)
Aquarius (2015–16)
B. J. and the Bear (1979–81)
Baa Baa Black Sheep (1976–78)
Banacek (1972–74)
Bare Essence (1983)
Barney Blake, Police Reporter (1948)
Bat Masterson (1958–61)
Bay City Blues (1983)
Baywatch (1989–90) (moved to syndication)
Behind Closed Doors (1958–59)
Believe (2013–14)
Berrenger's (1985)
Beverly Hills Buntz (1987–88)
Big Hawaii (1977)
The Bionic Woman (1977–78)
Bionic Woman (2007)
The Black Donnellys (2007)
The Blacklist: Redemption (2017)
Blacke's Magic (1986)
Blindspot (2015–20)
Bluff City Law (2019)
The Bold Ones (1969–73)
The Bold Ones: The Lawyers (1969–72)
The Bold Ones: The New Doctors (1969–73)
The Bold Ones: The Protectors (1969–70)
The Bold Ones: The Senator (1970–71)
Bonanza (1959–73)
The Book of Daniel (2006)
Boomtown (2002–03)
Boone (1983–84)
Born to the Wind (1982)
Bracken's World (1969–70)
Branded (1965–66)
The Brave (2017–18)
Bret Maverick (1981–82)
The Bronx Zoo (1987–88)
Buck Rogers in the 25th Century (1979–81)
Cain's Hundred (1961–62)
Camp (2013)
The Cape (2011)
Celebrity (1984)
Centennial (1978)
Chase (1973–74)
Chase (2010–11)
Chicago Justice (2017)
Chicago Story (1982)
CHiPs (1977–83)
Chuck (2007–12)
Cliffhangers (1979)
Cold Feet (1999)
Columbo (1968–78)
Constantine (2014–15)
Conviction (2006)
The Cosby Mysteries (1994–95)
Council of Dads (2020)
Crime Story (1986–88)
Crisis (2014)
Crossbones (2014)
Crossing Lines (2013) (moved to Ovation
Crossing Jordan (2001–07)
Crusoe (2008–09)
The Cube (1969)
Dan Raven (1960–61)
Daniel Boone (1964–70)
Dark Shadows (1991)
Dark Skies (1996–97)
David Cassidy: Man Undercover (1978–79)
Deadline (2000–01)
Debris (2021)
Deception (2013)
The Deputy (1959–61)
Do No Harm (2013)
The Doctor (1952–53)
Dr. Kildare (1961–66)
Dracula (2013)
Dragnet (1951–59)
Dragnet 1967 (1967–70)
Dream Street (1989)
The Duke (1979)
E-Ring (2005–06)
Earth 2 (1994–95)
Ed (2000–04)
The Eddie Capra Mysteries (1978–79)
Eerie, Indiana (1991–92)
The Eleventh Hour (1962–64)
Ellery Queen (1975–76)
Emerald City (2017)
Emergency! (1972–77)
The Endgame (2022)
The Enemy Within (2019)
ER (1994–2009)
The Event (2010–11)
Evergreen (1985)
Fame (1982–83)
Father Dowling Mysteries (1989–90)
Father Murphy (1981–83)
Favorite Son (1988)
Fear Itself (2008)
The Firm (2012)
Five Fingers (1959–60)
Flamingo Road (1981–82)
Flipper (1964–67)
Four in One (1970–71)
Freaks and Geeks (1999–2000)
Friday Night Lights (2006–11)
Game of Silence (2016)
Gavilan (1982)
Ghost Story (1972–73)
Gibbsville (1976)
The Girl from U.N.C.L.E. (1966–67)
Good Girls (2018–21)
Goodyear Television Playhouse (1951–57)
Goodyear Theatre (1957–60)
Great Ghost Tales (1961)
Grimm (2011–17)
Hannibal (2013–15)
Hardball (1989–90)
Harry's Law (2011–12)
Hawaii (2004)
Heartbeat (2016)
Heist (2006)
Hell Town (1985)
Here's Boomer (1980–82)
Heroes (2006–10)
Heroes Reborn (2015–16)
The High Chaparral (1967–71)
Highway to Heaven (1984–89)
Hill Street Blues (1981–87)
Holocaust (1978)
Homicide: Life on the Street (1993–99)
Hot Pursuit  (1984)
Hull High (1990)
Hunter (1984–91)
I Spy (1965–68)
I'll Fly Away (1991–93)
In the Heat of the Night (1988–92) (moved to CBS)
Inconceivable (2005)
The InBetween (2019)
The Invisible Man (1975–76)
Ironside (1967–75)
Ironside (2013)
J.J. Starbuck (1987–88)
JAG (1995–96) (moved to CBS)
James at 15 (1977–78)
Joe Forrester (1975–76)
Journeyman (2007)
Kate Loves a Mystery (1979)
Kidnapped (2006)
Kingpin (2003)
Kings (2009)
Klondike (1960–61)
Knight Rider (1982–86)
Knight Rider (2008–09)
Kraft Television Theatre (1947–58)
L.A. Law (1986–94)
Laramie (1959–63)
Laredo (1965–67)
Las Vegas (2003–08)
The Last Precinct (1986)
Law & Order: Criminal Intent (2001–07) (moved to USA Network)
Law & Order: Los Angeles (2010–11)
Law & Order: Trial by Jury (2005)
Law of the Plainsman (1959–60)
LAX (2004–05)
Legmen (1984)
Life (2007–09)
The Life and Times of Grizzly Adams (1977–78)
Lights Out (1946–52)
The Listener (2009) (moved to Ion) 
Lincoln Rhyme: Hunt for the Bone Collector (2020)
Lipstick Jungle (2008–09)
Little House on the Prairie (1974–83)
Love Bites (2011)
Love Story (1973–74)
Lucas Tanner (1974–75)
The Lyon's Den (2003)
M Squad (1957–60)
Madigan (1972–73)
The Magician (1973–74)
The Man and the Challenge (1959–60)
Man from Atlantis (1977–78)
Man from Interpol (1960)
The Man from U.N.C.L.E. (1964–68)
Mancuso, F.B.I. (1989–90)
Manifest (2018–21) (moved to Netflix)
Manimal (1983)
Mann & Machine (1992)
The Master (1984)
Matlock (1986–92) (moved to ABC)
McClain's Law (1981–82)
McCloud (1970–77)
McMillan & Wife (1971–76)
Medic (1954–56)
Medical Investigation (2004–05)
Medium (2005–09) (moved to CBS)
Mercy (2009–10)
Merlin (2009)
Miami Vice (1984–89)
Midnight Caller (1988–91)
Midnight, Texas (2017–18)
Misfits of Science (1985–86)
Mister Sterling (2003)
Movin' On (1974–76)
Mr. Novak (1963–65)
Mrs. Columbo (1979–80)
Mulligan's Stew (1977)
My Own Worst Enemy (2008)
The Mysteries of Laura (2014–16)
Mysterious Ways (2000–02)
The Name of the Game (1968–71)
National Velvet (1960–62)
The NBC Mystery Movie (1971–77)
Nero Wolfe (1981)
New Amsterdam (2018–23)
Nichols (1971–72)
Night Gallery (1970–73)
The Night Shift (2014–17)
Nightingales (1989)
Noble House (1988)
Once an Eagle (1976)
Ordinary Joe (2021–22)
The Oregon Trail (1977)
The Others (2000)
Our House (1986–88)
Outlaws (1960–62)
Parenthood (2010–15)
Partners in Crime  (1984)
Persons Unknown (2010)
Peter Gunn (1958–60) (moved to ABC) 
Peter the Great (1986)
Petrocelli (1974–76)
The Philanthropist (2009)
The Philco Television Playhouse (1948–55)
The Playboy Club (2011)
Players (1997–98)
Police Story (1973–77)
Police Woman (1974–78)
The Powers of Matthew Star (1982–83)
The Pretender (1996–2000)
Prime Suspect (2011–12)
Private Eye (1987–88)
Profiler (1996–2000)
Project U.F.O. (1978–79)
Providence (1999–2002)
Quantum Leap (1989–93)
Quarterlife (2008)
Quincy, M.E. (1976–83)
Quinn Martin's Tales of the Unexpected (1977)
Raines (2007)
Reasonable Doubts (1991–93)
Remington Steele (1982–87)
Revelations (2005)
Reverie (2018)
Revolution (2012–14)
Riptide (1984–86)
Rise (2018)
Robert Montgomery Presents (1950–57)
The Rockford Files (1974–80)
Rosetti and Ryan (1977)
The Round Table (1992)
The Rousters (1983–84)
Route 66 (1993)
Run for Your Life (1965–68)
Sam Benedict (1962–63)
Sarge (1971–72)
Saturday Roundup (1951)
Saving Hope (2012) (moved to Ion)
seaQuest DSV (1993–96)
Secret Service (1992–93)
Seventh Avenue (1977)
Shades of Blue (2016–18)
Shannon's Deal (1990–91)
Shirley (1979–80)
Shōgun (1980)
Siberia (2013)
Sisters (1991–96)
The Slap (2015)
Smash (2012–13)
Sonny Spoon (1988)
South Beach (1993)
Southland (2009) (moved to TNT)
St. Elsewhere (1982–88)
Star Trek (1966–69)
State of Affairs (2014–15)
Stingray (1985–87)
Studio 60 on the Sunset Strip (2006–07)
Supertrain (1979)
Surface (2005–06)
$weepstake$ (1979)
Sweet Justice (1994–95)
Sword of Justice (1978–79)
T.H.E. Cat (1966–67)
Taken (2017–18)
Tales of Wells Fargo (1957–62)
Tarzan (1966–68)
Tate (1960)
Tattingers (1988–89)
Taxi Brooklyn (2014)
Temple Houston (1963–64)
Then Came Bronson (1969–70)
The Thing About Pam (2022)
Third Watch (1999–2005)
This Is Us (2016–22)
Thriller (1960–62)
Timeless (2016–18)
Titans (2000)
Trauma (2009–10)
Trinity (1998)
The Troubleshooters (1959–60)
UC: Undercover (2001–02)
Undercovers (2010)
V (1983)
V: The Final Battle (1984)
V: The Series (1984–85)
The Village (2019)
Viper (1994) (moved to syndication)
The Virginian (1962–71)
Voyagers! (1982–83)
Wagon Train (1957–62) (moved to ABC)
The West Wing (1999–2006)
What Really Happened to the Class of '65? (1977–78)
Wide Country (1962–63)
Windfall (2006)
A Year in the Life (1986; 1987–88)
The Yellow Rose (1983–84)
You, Me and the Apocalypse (2016)
Your Prize Story (1952)
Zoey's Extraordinary Playlist (2020–21)

Soap operas

Another World (1964–99)
Ben Jerrod (1963)
The Bennetts (1953–54)
Bright Promise (1969–72)
Concerning Miss Marlowe (1954–55)
A Date with Life (1955–56)
Days of Our Lives (1965–2022) (moved to Peacock)
The Doctors (1963–82)
Fairmeadows USA (1951–52)
First Love (1954–55)
Follow Your Heart (1953–54)
From These Roots (1958–61)
Generations (1989–91)
Golden Windows (1954–55)
The Greatest Gift (1954–55)
Hawkins Falls, Population 6200 (1950–55)
Hidden Faces (1968–69)
The House on High Street (1959–60)
How to Survive a Marriage (1974–75)
Kitty Foyle (1958)
Lovers and Friends (1977–78)
Miss Susan (1951)
Modern Romances (1954–58)
Moment of Truth (1965)
Morning Star (1965–66)
One Man's Family (1949–55)
Our Five Daughters (1962)
Paradise Bay (1965–66)
Passions (1999–2007)
Return to Peyton Place (1972–74)
Santa Barbara (1984–93)
Search for Tomorrow (1982–86)
Somerset (1970–76)
Sunset Beach (1997–99)
Texas (1980–82)
These Are My Children (1949)
Three Steps to Heaven (1953–54)
A Time to Live (1954)
Today is Ours (1958)
The Way of the World (1955)
The World of Mr. Sweeney (1954–55)
Young Doctor Malone (1958–63)

Reality/non-scripted programming

The Adventures of Mark & Brian (1991)
Age of Love (2007)
American Dream Builders (2014)
American Gladiators (2008)
America's Got Talent: The Champions (2019–20)
America's Got Talent: Extreme (2022)
America's Most Talented Kid (2003)
America's Toughest Jobs (2008)
The Apprentice (2004–17)
The Apprentice: Martha Stewart (2005)
Average Joe (2003–05)
The Baby Borrowers (2008)
Best Time Ever with Neil Patrick Harris (2015)
Better Late Than Never (2016–18)
Betty White's Off Their Rockers (2012–13)
The Biggest Loser (2004–16) (moved to USA Network)
Bring the Funny (2019)
Caught on Camera with Nick Cannon (2014–16)
Celebrity Circus (2008)
Celebrity Cooking Showdown (2006)
The Chopping Block (2009)
Clash of the Choirs (2007)
The Contender (2005)
The Courtship (2022) (moved to USA Network)
Crime & Punishment (2002–04)
Dog Eat Dog (2002–03)
Ellen's Greatest Night of Giveaways (2019)
Escape Routes (2012)
Fashion Star (2012–13)
Fear Factor (2001–06; 2011–12)
First Dates (2017)
Forensic Files (2002)
For Love Or Money (2003–04)
Food Fighters (2014–15)
Get Out Alive with Bear Grylls (2013)
Grease: You're the One that I Want! (2007)
The Great American Road Trip (2009)
Hit Me, Baby, One More Time (2005)
Home Sweet Home (2021) (moved to Peacock)
Howie Do It (2009)
I Can Do That (2015)
I Witness Video (1992–94)
The Law Firm (2005)
Last Comic Standing (2003–04; 2006–08; 2010; 2014–15) 
Little Big Shots (2016–20)
Little Big Shots: Forever Young (2017)
Love in the Wild (2011–12)
Making It (2018–21)
The Marriage Ref (2010–11)
Meet My Folks (2002)
Momma's Boys (2008–09)
My Dad Is Better Than Your Dad (2008)
Nashville Star (2003–08)
Next Action Star (2004)
Phenomenon (2007)
Race to the Altar (2003)
Ready for Love (2013)
Real People (1979–84)
The Real Wedding Crashers (2007)
Running Wild with Bear Grylls (2014–18)
The Island (2015)
The Restaurant (2003–04)
School Pride (2010)
The Sing-Off (2009–11; 2013–14)
Songland (2019–20)
Spy TV (2001–02)
Stars Earn Stripes (2012)
Strong (2016)
Superstars of Dance (2009)
Take It All (2012)
Thank God You're Here (2007)
Three Wishes (2005)
The Titan Games (2019–20)
Tommy Lee Goes to College (2005)
Treasure Hunters (2006)
Unsolved Mysteries (1987–97) 
What Happened? (1992)
Who Wants to Marry My Dad? (2003–04)
World's Most Amazing Videos (1999-2001)
World of Dance (2017–20)

Game shows

1 vs. 100 (2006–08)
20 Questions (1949)
50 Grand Slam (1976)
All Star Secrets (1979)
Americana (1947–49)
Amne$ia (2008)
Baffle (1973–74)
Bank on the Stars (1954)
Battlestars (1981–83)
The Big Game (1958)
The Big Payoff (1951–53)
The Big Surprise (1955–57)
Blank Check (1975)
Blockbusters (1980–82; 1987)
Brains and Brawn (1958)
Brains & Brawn (1993)
Break the Bank (1949–52; 1953; 1956–57)
Bride and Groom (1953)
Caesars Challenge (1993–94)
Call My Bluff (1965)
Cannonball (2020)
Card Sharks (1978–81)
Celebrity Family Feud (2008)
Celebrity Sweepstakes (1974–76)
Chain Reaction (1980)
Choose Up Sides (1956)
Classic Concentration (1987–91)
College Bowl (1963–70)
Concentration (1958–73)
Deal or No Deal (2005–09)
Dollar A Second (1954; 1955; 1957)
Dotto (1958 Primetime only)
Double Up (1992)
Dough Re Mi (1958–60)
Down You Go (1956)
Dream House (1983–84)
Ellen's Game of Games (2017–21)
Eye Guess (1966–69)
Face The Ace (2009–10)
Family Game Fight! (2021–22)
Family Secrets (1993)
Fantasy (1982–83)
The Fun Factory (1976)
Gambit (1980–81)
Genius Junior (2018)
Go (1983–84)
The Gong Show (1976–78)
Haggis Baggis (1958–59)
High-Low (1957)
High Rollers (1974–76; 1978–80)
Hit Man (1983)
Hold That Note (1957)
Hollywood Game Night (2013–20)
Hollywood Squares (1966–80)
Hot Potato (1984)
Identity (2006–07)
I'll Bet (1965)
I'm Telling! (1987–88)
It Could Be You (1956–61)
It Pays to Be Ignorant (1951)
It Takes Two (1969–70)
It's Anybody's Guess (1977)
It's Worth What? (2011)
Jackpot! (1974–75)
Jackpot Bowling (1959–61)
Jeopardy! (1964–75; 1978–79)
Just Men! (1983)
Knockout (1977–78)
Las Vegas Gambit (1980–81)
Laugh Line (1959)
Let's Make a Deal (1963–68; 1990–91; 2003)
Letters to Laugh-In (1969)
Lohman & Barkley's Name Droppers (1969–70)
The Magnificent Marble Machine (1975–76)
Make the Connection (1955)
Masquerade Party (1952; 1957; 1958–59; 1960)
Match Game (1962–69)
Match Game-Hollywood Squares Hour (1983–84)
Memory Game (1971)
The Million Second Quiz (2013)
Mindreaders (1979–80)
Minute to Win It (2010–11)
Missing Links (1963–64)
Music Bingo (1958)
Musical Chairs (1955)
Name That Tune (1953–59; 1974–75; 1977; moved to Fox)
National Heads Up Poker Championship (2005–11; 2013)
Pantomime Quiz (1952)
Password Plus (1979–82)
People are Funny (1954–60)
People Will Talk (1963)
Personality (1967–69)
Place the Face (1953–55)
Play Your Hunch (1959–63)
The Price Is Right (1956–63)
Poker After Dark (2007–11)
Queen for a Day (1956–60)
Quiz Kids (1949–53)
Reach for the Stars (1967)
Runaround (1972–73)
Sale of the Century (1969–73; 1983–89)
Say When!! (1961–65)
Scattergories (1993)
Scrabble (1984–90; 1993)
Shoot for the Stars (1977)
Showdown (1966)
The Singing Bee (2007)
Small Fortune (2021)
Snap Judgment (1967–69)
Split Personality (1959–60)
Storybook Squares (1969; 1976–77)
Stumpers (1976)
Super Password (1984–89)
Take It All (2012)
Three for the Money (1975)
Three on a Match (1971–74)
Tic-Tac-Dough (1956–59)
Time Machine (1985)
To Say the Least (1977–78)
To Tell the Truth (1990–91)
Treasure Hunt (1957–59)
Truth or Consequences (1954–65)
Twenty One (1956–58; 2000–01)
Two For the Money (1952–53)
Two in Love (1954)
What's This Song? (1964–65)
Wheel of Fortune (1975–89; 1991)
Who Said That? (1948–55)
The Who, What, or Where Game (1969–74)
Who's Still Standing? (2011–12)
Win, Lose or Draw (1987–89)
The Winner Is (2013)
Winner Take All (1952)
Winning Streak (1974–75)
The Wizard of Odds (1973–74)
Wordplay (1986–87)
You Bet Your Life (1950–61)
You Don't Say! (1963–69)
Your First Impression (1962–64)
Your Number's Up (1985)
You're Putting Me On (1969)

Sports

Saturday Night's Main Event (1985–91)
WWF The Main Event (1988–91)

Variety series

The Andy Williams Show (1962–67; 1969–71)
Barbara Mandrell and the Mandrell Sisters (1980–82)
The Bell Telephone Hour (1959–68)
The Big Show (1980)
The Bob Hope Specials
Caesar's Hour (1954–57)
The Colgate Comedy Hour (1950–55)
The NBC Comedy Hour (1956)
The David Letterman Show (1980)
The Dean Martin Show (1965–74)
The Dinah Shore Show (1951–57)
The Dinah Shore Chevy Show (1956–63)
The Don Knotts Show (1970–71)
The Ernie Kovacs Show (1952–53)
The Flip Wilson Show (1970–74)
Five Star Jubilee (1961)
The Ford Show (1956–61)
Four Star Revue (1950–53)
Friday Night Videos (1983–95)
The George Gobel Show (1954–59)
Hallmark Hall of Fame (1951–79)
Henry Morgan's Great Talent Hunt (1951)
Hot Country Nights (1991–92)
Howie Do It (2009)
Kraft Television Theatre (1947–53; 1955–58)
Letter to Loretta (1953–61)
The Martha Raye Show (1954–56)
Maya & Marty (2016)
The Midnight Special (1972–81)
The Mystery Chef (1949)
Most Outrageous Moments (2005–06; 2008–09)
The Nat King Cole Show (1956–57)
The Paul Winchell Show (1950–54)
The Perry Como Show ( Perry Como's Kraft Music Hall) (1955–67)
Pink Lady and Jeff (1980)
The Rerun Show (2002)
The Richard Pryor Show (1977)
Rowan & Martin's Laugh-In (1968–73)
SCTV Network 90 (1981–83)
Sing Along With Mitch (1961–66)
The Steve Allen Show (1956–60)
Texaco Star Theater (1948–56)
Walt Disney's Wonderful World of Color ( The Wonderful World of Disney, Disney's Wonderful World, The Magical World of Disney) (1961–81; 1988–90)
Your Show of Shows (1950–54)

Talk shows

Daytime

A Closer Look with Faith Daniels (1990–93)
America Alive! (1978–79)
Dr. Dean (1992)
Dinah! (1970–74)
The Jane Whitney Show (1994)
John and Leeza from Hollywood (1993–94)
Later Today (1999–2000)
Leeza (1994–99)
One on One with John Tesh (1991–92)
The Other Side (1994–95)
The David Letterman Show (1980)
The Marsha Warfield Show (1990)
The Regis Philbin Show (1981–82)
Today's Take (2000–17)
Today with Kathie Lee and Hoda (2008–19)

Late night

The Jay Leno Show (2009–10)
Last Call with Carson Daly (2002–19)
Late Night with Conan O'Brien (1993–2009)
Late Night with David Letterman (1982–93)
Late Night with Jimmy Fallon (2009–14)
Later (1988–2001)
A Little Late with Lilly Singh (2019–21)
The Tomorrow Show (1973–82)
The Tonight Show Starring Johnny Carson (1962–92)
The Tonight Show with Conan O'Brien (2009–10)
The Tonight Show with Jay Leno (1992–2009; 2010–14)
Tonight Starring Jack Paar (1957–62)
Tonight Starring Steve Allen (1954–57)

Saturday mornings

Shows
2 Hip 4 TV (1988)
3-2-1 Penguins! (2006–09; 2010)
The Adventures of Super Mario Bros. 3 (1990)
ALF: The Animated Series (1987–89)
ALF Tales (1988–89)
Alvin and the Chipmunks (1983–90)
Around the World in Eighty Days (1972–73)
Astro Boy (1966–78)
Astroblast (2014–16)
The Atom Ant/Secret Squirrel Show (1965–67)
Babar (2006–07; 2008; 2009–12)
Baggy Pants and the Nitwits (1977)
The Banana Splits Adventure Hour (1968–70)
The Barkleys (1972)
Batman and the Super 7 (1980–81)
Big John, Little John (1976)
Birdman and the Galaxy Trio (1967–68)
The Bugaloos (1970–72)
The Bullwinkle Show (1963–64; 1981–82)
Buford and the Galloping Ghost (1978)
Butch Cassidy and the Sundance Kids (1973)
Camp Candy (1989–91)
Captain N: The Game Master (1989–91)
Casper and the Angels (1979)
CB Bears (1977)
The Chica Show (2013–16)
Chip and Pepper's Cartoon Madness (1991–92)
City Guys (1997–2001)
Clangers (2015–16)
The Completely Mental Misadventures of Ed Grimley (1988)
Cool McCool (1966–67)
The Daffy Duck Show (1978–82)
Darcy's Wild Life (2004–06)
Doctor Dolittle (1970–71)
Dragon (2006–08)
Drawing Power! (1980)
Dynomutt, Dog Wonder (1980)
Earth to Luna! (2015–16)
Emergency +4 (1973–74)
Endurance (2002–06)
Fabulous Funnies (1978–79)
Fireball XL5 (1963–65)
Flight 29 Down (2005–06)
The Flintstone Comedy Show (1980–81)
The Flintstone Funnies (1982–84)
The Flintstones (1967–81)
Floogals (2016)
Foofur (1986–88)
Fraggle Rock: The Animated Series (1987)
Fred and Barney Meet the Shmoo (1979–80)
Fred and Barney Meet the Thing (1979)
The Funky Phantom (1980)
Galaxy Goof-Ups (1978–79)
The Gary Coleman Show (1982)
Give (2016–18)
Godzilla (1978–79)
The Go-Go Globetrotters (1978)
Going Bananas (1984)
Gravedale High (1990)
Gummi Bears (1985–88)
Guys Next Door (1990–91)
H.R. Pufnstuf (1969)
Hang Time (1995–2000)
Health + Happiness with Mayo Clinic (2018)
The Hector Heathcote Show (1963–65)
Here Comes the Grump (1969–70)
Hong Kong Phooey (1980–81)
Hoppity Hooper (1964–67)
Hot Dog (1970–71)
The Houndcats (1972)
Howdy Doody (1947–60)
I Am the Greatest: The Adventures of Muhammad Ali (1977)
I'm Telling! (1987–88)
The Incredible Hulk (1982–83)
It's Punky Brewster (1985–86)
Jacob Two-Two (2006–07; 2009)
Jana of the Jungle (1978)
Jane and the Dragon (2006–08; 2009–10; 2012)
Jeff Corwin Unleashed (2005–06)
The Jetsons (1965–67; 1971–76; 1979–81; 1982–83)
Jonny Quest (1978–79)
Josie and the Pussycats (1975–76)
Journey with Dylan Dreyer (2016–18)
Justin Time (2012–14)
The Karate Kid (1989)
Kenny the Shark (2003–06)
Kid 'n Play (1990)
The Kid Super Power Hour with Shazam! (1981–82)
Kidd Video (1984–85)
King Leonardo and His Short Subjects (1960–63)
Kissyfur (1986–88)
The Krofft Superstar Hour (1978–79)
Land of the Lost (1974–76)
Larryboy: The Cartoon Adventures (2006–07)
Lazer Tag Academy (1986)
LazyTown (2012–16)
Little Robots (2011–12)
The Magic School Bus (2010–12)
Make Way For Noddy (2013–14)
Mister T (1983–85)
My Friend Rabbit (2007–09)
Natutally, Danny Seo (2016–19)
NBA Inside Stuff (1990–2002)
The New Adventures of Huckleberry Finn (1968–69)
The New Adventures of Flash Gordon (1979–82)
The New Archie and Sabrina Hour (1977)
The New Fantastic Four (1978)
The New Fred and Barney Show (1979)
The New Shmoo (1979–80)
Nina's World (2016)
Noodle and Doodle (2012–16)
One to Grow On (1983–89)
Operation Junkyard (2002–03)
Pajanimals (2012–14)
Pearlie (2010–12)
The Pink Panther Show (1969–78)
Poppy Cat (2012–13; 2014–15)
Postman Pat (2007–08)
Prehistoric Planet (2002–03)
ProStars (1991)
The Red Hand Gang (1977)
Return to the Planet of the Apes (1975)
The Roman Holidays (1972)
The Ruff and Reddy Show (1957–60; 1962–64)
Ruff-Ruff, Tweet and Dave (2015–16)
Run, Joe, Run (1974–75)
Runaround (1972–73)
Samson & Goliath (1967–68)
Saturday Morning Videos (1990–92)
Saved by the Bell (1989–93)
Saved by the Bell: The New Class (1993–2000)
Scout's Safari (2002–04)
Sealab 2020 (1972)
Search and Rescue: The Alpha Team (1977–78)
The Secret Lives of Waldo Kitty (1975)
The Shari Lewis Show (1960–63)
Shelldon (2009–12)
Shirley Temple's Storybook (1958–61)
Shirt Tales (1982–83)
Sigmund and the Sea Monsters (1973–75)
Skunked TV (2004)
The Smurfs (1981–89)
Snorks (1984–87, moved to ABC and USA Network in 1988 for the final season)
Space Cats 1991–92)
Space Ghost and Frankenstein Jr. (1976–77)
The Space Kidettes (1966–67)
Space Sentinels (1977)
Space Stars (1981–82)
Spider-Man and His Amazing Friends (1981–83)
Sport Billy (1982)
Star Trek: The Animated Series (1973–74)
Strange Days at Blake Holsey High (2002–06)
The Super 6 (1966–69)
The Super Globetrotters (1979)
Super President (1967–68)
Super Mario World (1991)
Take a Giant Step/Talking with a Giant (1971–73)
Terrific Trucks (2016)
Thundarr the Barbarian (1983)
Thunder (1977–78)
Time Warp Trio (2005–06)
Top Cat (1965–66; 1967–69)
Trading Spaces: Boys vs. Girls (2003–06)
Tree Fu Tom (2013–16)
Turbo Dogs (2008–09; 2010–12)
Tutenstein (2003–06)
Underdog (1964–66; 1968–70; 1972–73)
VeggieTales (2006–09)
The Voyager with Josh Garcia (2016–19)
Watch Mr. Wizard (1951–65)
Westwind (1975)
Wheelie and the Chopper Bunch (1974)
Wilderness Vet with Dr. Oakley (2016–18)
The Wiggles (2012–13)
Willa's Wild Life (2009–12)
Wish Kid (1991)
Yo Yogi! (1991)
Yogi's Space Race (1978)
Zou (2014)
The Zula Patrol (2008–09; 2012)

Programming blocks
TNBC (1992–2002)
Discovery Kids on NBC (2002–06)
Qubo (2006–12)
NBC Kids (2012–16)

Documentary series

C. Everett Koop, M.D. (1991)
National Geographic Specials (1995–99)
NBC White Paper (1960–87)
Japan Spectacular Show (January 1959)
This Is Your Life (1952–61)
Victory at Sea (1952–53)
Wild Kingdom (1963–71)
The Widower (2021)

Other

Best Sellers (1976–77)
Billboard Music Awards (2018—22)
Ctrl (2009)
In the Loop with iVillage (2006–07)
The Jim Henson Hour (1989)
The Magic Clown (1949–54)
Miss America (1966–96; 2019)
Miss Teen USA (2003–07)
Miss Universe (2003–15)
Miss USA (2003–15)
The Mystery Chef (1949)
Quill Awards (2005)
Soap Opera Digest Awards (1984–2000)
Telecomics (1950–51)
They Go On (1997)
The Wizard of Oz (1968–75)

Specials

One Hour in Wonderland (December 25, 1950)
Mister Magoo's Christmas Carol (December 18, 1962)
The Story of Christmas (December 22, 1963)
Return to Oz (February 9, 1964)
Rudolph the Red-Nosed Reindeer (December 6, 1964)
Jack and the Beanstalk (February 26, 1967)
Cricket on the Hearth (December 18, 1967)
The Fabulous Funnies (February 11, 1968)
The Mouse on the Mayflower (November 23, 1968)
Elvis (December 3, 1968)
The Little Drummer Boy (December 19, 1968)
The Bob Hope Christmas Special: Around the World with the USO (January 16, 1969)
Uncle Sam Magoo (February 15, 1970)
The Grand Opening of Walt Disney World (October 29, 1971)
Tennessee Ernie Ford's White Christmas (December 23, 1972)
Timex Presents Opryland U.S.A. (October 23, 1973)
The Bear Who Slept Through Christmas (December 17, 1973)
Christmas with the Bing Crosbys (December 15, 1974)
The First Christmas: The Story of the First Christmas Snow (December 19, 1975)
The First Easter Rabbit (April 9, 1976)
NBC: The First Fifty Years (November 21, 1976)
The Little Drummer Boy, Book II (December 13, 1976)
Bob Hope's All-Star Comedy Spectacular from Lake Tahoe (January 21, 1977)
King of the Beasts (April 9, 1977)
Mac Davis: Sounds Like Home (June 16, 1977)
NBC: The First Fifty Years - A Closer Look (October 23, 1977)
A Flintstone Christmas (December 7, 1977)
The Bob Hope All Star Christmas Comedy Special (December 19, 1977)
The Fourth King (December 23, 1977)
50 Years of Country Music (January 22, 1978)
NBC: The First Fifty Years - A Closer Look, Part Two (January 31, 1978)
A Special Valentine with the Family Circus (February 10, 1978)
A Tribute to 'Mr. Television' Milton Berle (March 26, 1978)
The Flintstones: Little Big League (April 6, 1978)
Happy Birthday, Bob (May 29, 1978)
NBC Salutes the 25th Anniversary of the Wonderful World of Disney (September 13–17, 1978)
Witch's Night Out (October 27, 1978)
A Mac Davis Special: Christmas Odyssey - 2010 (December 12, 1978)
Bob Hope All Star Christmas Special (December 22, 1978)
The Stingiest Man in Town (December 23, 1978)
Cher... and Other Fantasies (March 7, 1979)
The Flintstones Meet Rockula and Frankenstone (October 30, 1979)
Casper's Halloween Special (October 30, 1979)
The Berenstain Bears' Christmas Tree (December 3, 1979)
The Little Rascals Christmas Special (December 3, 1979)
Jack Frost (December 13, 1979)
Casper's First Christmas (December 18, 1979)
A Family Circus Christmas (December 18, 1979)
A Christmas Special... With Love, Mac Davis (December 24, 1979)
Lucy Moves to NBC (February 8, 1980)
Daffy Duck's Easter Show (April 1, 1980)
Last of the Red-Hot Dragons (April 1, 1980)
Mac Davis 10th Anniversary Special: I Still Believe in Music (May 20, 1980)
The Flintstones' New Neighbors (September 26, 1980)
The Harlem Globetrotters Meet Snow White (September 27—October 18, 1980)
Bob Hope for President (November 1, 1980)
The Flintstones: Fred's Final Fling (November 7, 1980)
Daffy Duck's Thanks-for-Giving Special (November 20, 1980)
The Berenstain Bears Meet Bigpaw (November 20, 1980)
Alan King's Thanksgiving Special: What Have We Got to Be Thankful For? (November 25, 1980)
The Berenstain Bears' Easter Surprise (April 14, 1981)
Dennis the Menace in Mayday for Mother (May 8, 1981)
Here Come the Smurfs (June 19, 1981)
The Funtastic World of Hanna-Barbera Arena Show (June 25, 1981)
The Flintstones: Wind-Up Wilma (October 4, 1981)
The Flintstones: Jogging Fever (October 11, 1981)
A Chipmunk Christmas (December 14, 1981)
The Berenstain Bears' Comic Valentine (February 13, 1982)
A Family Circus Easter (April 8, 1982)
The Smurfs Springtime Special (April 8, 1982)
The Smurfs Christmas Special (December 12, 1982)
Christmas in Washington (December 13, 1982—December 1997)
The Merriest of the Merry: Bob Hope's Christmas Show, A Bagful of Comedy (December 20, 1982)
My Smurfy Valentine (February 13, 1983)
The Berenstain Bears Play Ball (May 6, 1983)
George Burns Celebrates 80 Years in Show Business (September 19, 1983)
Bob Hope's Salute to NASA: 25 Years of Reaching for the Stars (September 19, 1983)
Deck the Halls with Wacky Walls (December 11, 1983)
Bob Hope's USO Christmas in Beirut (January 15, 1984)
I Love the Chipmunks Valentine Special (February 12, 1984)
The Homemade Comedy Special (April 8, 1984)
The Smurfic Games (May 20, 1984)
Bob Hope's Unrehearsed Antics of the Stars (September 28, 1984)
Mickey's Christmas Carol (December 10, 1984)
A Christmas Dream (December 16, 1984)
It's Ho-Ho Hope's Jolly Christmas Hour (December 16, 1984)
Smurfily Ever After (February 13, 1985)
Disneyland's 30th Anniversary Celebration (February 18, 1985)
A Chipmunk Reunion (April 13, 1985)
Bob Hope Buys NBC? (September 17, 1985)
NBC 60th Anniversary Celebration (May 12, 1986)
Disneyland's Summer Vacation Party (May 23, 1986)
Bob Hope's High-Flying Birthday (May 26, 1986)
Down and Out with Donald Duck (March 22, 1987)
Disney's Golden Anniversary of Snow White and the Seven Dwarfs (May 22, 1987)
An All New Adventure of Disney's Sport Goofy (May 27, 1987)
Sport Goofy in Soccermania (May 27, 1987)
'Tis the Season to Be Smurfy (December 13, 1987)
Disney's Magic in the Magic Kingdom (February 12, 1988)
Mickey's 60th Birthday (November 13, 1988)
Seasons Greetings: An Evening with John Williams and the Boston Pops Orchestra (December 23, 1988)
Sesame Street... 20 Years & Still Counting (April 7, 1989)
All-Star Tribute to Kareem Abdul-Jabbar (May 12, 1989)
Hound Town (September 1, 1989)
The Wickedest Witch (October 30, 1989)
Spy Magazine Presents How to Be Famous (April 4, 1990)
Cartoon All-Stars to the Rescue (April 21, 1990)
...Where's Rodney? (June 11, 1990)
The Jackie Bison Show (July 2, 1990)
Turner & Hooch (July 9, 1990)
A Very Retail Christmas (December 24, 1990)
Bob Hope's Christmas Cheer from Saudi Arabia (January 12, 1991)
Rockin' Through the Decades (January 18, 1991)
Bob Hope and Other Young Comedians: The World Laughs, Young and Old (March 14, 1992)
Noël (December 4, 1992)
Inspector Gadget Saves Christmas (December 4, 1992)
Bob Hope's Four-Star Christmas Fiesta from San Antonio (December 19, 1992)
Bob Hope: The First 90 Years (May 14, 1993)
The Defense Rests: A Tribute to Raymond Burr (October 22, 1993) 
The Town Santa Forgot (December 3, 1993)
The Twelve Days of Christmas (December 3, 1993)
Bob Hope's Bag Full of Christmas Memories (December 15, 1993)
Legend to Legend Night: A Celebrity Cavalcade (December 28, 1993)
You're in the Super Bowl, Charlie Brown (January 18, 1994)
Bob Hope's Birthday Memories (May 14, 1994)
Bob Hope's Young Comedians: Making America Laugh (August 27, 1994)
Hopes for the Holidays (December 14, 1994)
Bob Hope's Young Comedians: A New Generation of Laughs (March 25, 1995)
Bob Hope: Memories of World War II (August 5, 1995)
The Omen (September 8, 1995)
Kelsey Grammer Salutes Jack Benny (November 30, 1995)
Bob Hope: Laughing with the Presidents (November 23, 1996)
Monsters vs. Aliens: Mutant Pumpkins from Outer Space (October 28, 2009)
Merry Madagascar (November 17, 2009)
Scared Shrekless (October 28, 2010)
Kung Fu Panda Holiday (November 24, 2010)
Trolls Holiday (November 24, 2017)
How to Train Your Dragon: Homecoming (December 3, 2019)
Trolls: Holiday in Harmony	 (November 26, 2021)

Television films

See How They Run (October 7, 1964)
The Hanged Man (November 18, 1964)
Fame Is the Name of the Game (November 26, 1966)
The Doomsday Flight (December 13, 1966)
How I Spent My Summer Vacation (January 7, 1967)
The Longest Hundred Miles (January 21, 1967)
Stranger on the Run (October 31, 1967)
Companions in Nightmare (November 23, 1968)
Something for a Lonely Man (November 26, 1968)
Trial Run (January 18, 1969)
Fear No Evil (March 3, 1969)
The Lonely Profession (October 21, 1969)
Destiny of a Spy (October 27, 1969)
Run a Crooked Mile (November 18, 1969)
Ritual of Evil (February 23, 1970)
Lost Flight (August 12, 1970)
A Clear and Present Danger (August 29, 1970)
The Aquarians (October 24, 1970)
The Intruders (November 10, 1970)
Breakout (December 8, 1970)
Who Killed the Mysterious Mr. Foster? (February 1, 1971)
Hitched (March 31, 1971)
River of Mystery (October 1, 1971)
The Harness (November 12, 1971)
The Snow Goose (November 15, 1971)
Cutter (January 26, 1972)
The Man Who Came to Dinner (November 29, 1972)
The Judge and Jake Wyler (December 2, 1972)
The Great Man's Whiskers (February 13, 1973)
Poor Devil (February 14, 1973)
The Norliss Tapes (February 21, 1973)
Partners in Crime (March 24, 1973)
Chase (March 24, 1973)
Savage (March 31, 1973)
Drive Hard, Drive Fast (September 11, 1973)
The Questor Tapes (January 23, 1974)
Rex Harrison Presents Stories of Love (May 1, 1974)
The Underground Man (May 6, 1974)
The Cay (October 21, 1974)
The Law (October 22, 1974)
Brief Encounter (November 12, 1974)
This Is the West That Was (December 17, 1974)
Sarah T. - Portrait of a Teenage Alcoholic (February 11, 1975)
The Last Day (February 15, 1975)
One of Our Own (May 5, 1975)
Guilty or Innocent: The Sam Sheppard Murder Case (November 17, 1975)
The Manhunter (April 3, 1976)
Law and Order (May 6, 1976)
The Return of the World's Greatest Detective (June 16, 1976)
Sherlock Holmes in New York (October 18, 1976)
Richie Brockelman: The Missing 24 Hours (October 27, 1976)
The Savage Bees (November 22, 1976)
Flood! (November 24, 1976)
The Loneliest Runner (December 20, 1976)
The City (January 12, 1977)
Stonestreet: Who Killed the Centerfold Model? (January 16, 1977)
Yesterday's Child (February 3, 1977)
Tail Gunner Joe (February 6, 1977)
Dead of Night (March 29, 1977)
The Possessed (May 1, 1977)
Code Name: Diamond Head (May 3, 1977)
Fire! (May 8, 1977)
Pine Canyon Is Burning (May 18, 1977)
Spectre (May 21, 1977)
The Man with the Power (May 24, 1977)
Ransom for Alice! (June 2, 1977)
Charlie Cobb: Nice Night for a Hanging (June 9, 1977)
The 3,000 Mile Chase (June 16, 1977)
Exo-Man (June 18, 1977)
Sharon: Portrait of a Mistress (October 31, 1977)
The Hobbit (November 27, 1977)
The Ghost of Flight 401 (February 18, 1978)
Love Is Not Enough (June 12, 1978)
Frankie & Annette: The Second Time Around (November 18, 1978)
Someone's Watching Me! (November 29, 1978)
The New Adventures of Heidi (December 13, 1978)
Mandrake (January 24, 1979)
Women in White (February 8, 1979)
Sooner or Later (March 25, 1979)
The Legend of the Golden Gun (April 10, 1979)
When Hell Was in Session (October 8, 1979)
Undercover with the KKK (October 23, 1979)
The Man in the Santa Claus Suit (December 23, 1979)
Brave New World (March 7, 1980)
Alex and the Doberman Gang (April 11, 1980)
Cry of the Innocent (June 19, 1980)
The Great American Traffic Jam (October 2, 1980)
Enola Gay: The Men, the Mission, the Atomic Bomb (November 23, 1980)
Children of Divorce (November 24, 1980)
The Day the Women Got Even (December 4, 1980)
Elvis and the Beauty Queen (March 1, 1981)
The Archer: Fugitive from the Empire (April 12, 1981)
The Star Maker (May 11, 1981)
Death of a Centerfold: The Dorothy Stratten Story (November 1, 1981)
Fire on the Mountain (November 23, 1981)
Child Bride of Short Creek (December 7, 1981)
Two Guys from Muck (March 29, 1982)
Sister, Sister (June 7, 1982)
Flash Gordon: The Greatest Adventure of All (August 21, 1982)
The Facts of Life Goes to Paris (September 25, 1982)
Remembrance of Love (December 6, 1982)
The Invisible Woman (February 13, 1983)
The Night the Bridge Fell Down (February 28, 1983)
Jacobo Timerman: Prisoner Without a Name, Cell Without a Number (May 22, 1983)
Adam (October 10, 1983)
The Jerk, Too (January 6, 1984)
Family Secrets (May 13, 1984)
Shattered Vows (October 29, 1984)
Florence Nightingale (April 7, 1985)
Wallenberg: A Hero's Story (April 8–9, 1985)
Family Ties Vacation (September 23, 1985)
Streets of Justice (November 10, 1985)
Adam: His Song Continues (September 29, 1986)
Christmas Eve (December 22, 1986)
The Facts of Life Down Under (February 15, 1987)
Bates Motel (July 5, 1987)
Stamp of a Killer (November 1, 1987)
Fatal Confession: A Father Dowling Mystery (November 30, 1987)
Downpayment on Murder (December 6, 1987)
Man Against the Mob (January 10, 1988)
The Taking of Flight 847: The Uli Derickson Story (May 2, 1988)
The Incredible Hulk Returns (May 22, 1988)
Goddess of Love (November 20, 1988)
In the Line of Duty: The F.B.I. Murders (November 27, 1988)
I'll Be Home for Christmas (December 12, 1988)
She Was Marked for Murder (December 18, 1988)
The Cover Girl and the Cop (January 16, 1989)
Original Sin (February 20, 1989)
Love Is Murder (April 3, 1989)
The Trial of the Incredible Hulk (May 7, 1989)
Nasty Boys (September 22, 1989)
Settle the Score (October 30, 1989)
Turn Back the Clock (November 20, 1989)
Little White Lies (November 27, 1989)
Man Against the Mob: The Chinatown Murders (December 10, 1989)
Lady in the Corner (December 11, 1989)
Without Her Consent (January 14, 1990)
The Death of the Incredible Hulk (February 18, 1990)
Too Young to Die? (February 26, 1990)
The Old Man and the Sea (March 25, 1990)
The Girl Who Came Between Them (April 1, 1990)
Fall from Grace (April 29, 1990)
Hiroshima: Out of the Ashes (August 6, 1990)
Joshua's Heart (September 10, 1990)
Babies (September 17, 1990)
Casey's Gift: For Love of a Child (September 24, 1990)
The Love She Sought (October 21, 1990)
Thanksgiving Day (November 19, 1990)
In the Line of Duty: A Cop for the Killing (November 25, 1990)
Good Cops, Bad Cops (December 9, 1990)
The Marla Hanson Story (February 4, 1991)
The Summer My Father Grew Up (March 3, 1991)
Daughters of Privilege (March 17, 1991)
Don't Touch My Daughter (April 7, 1991)
White Hot: The Mysterious Murder of Thelma Todd (May 5, 1991)
In the Line of Duty: Manhunt in the Dakotas (May 12, 1991)
Knight Rider 2000 (May 19, 1991)
Wild Texas Wind (September 23, 1991)
And While She Was Gone (September 29, 1991)
She Says She's Innocent (October 28, 1991)
Deadly Medicine (November 11, 1991)
Deception: A Mother's Secret (November 24, 1991)
A Mother's Justice (November 25, 1991)
The Story Lady (December 9, 1991)
In the Best Interest of the Children (February 16, 1992)
What She Doesn't Know (February 23, 1992)
Woman with a Past (March 2, 1992)
In the Shadow of a Killer (April 27, 1992)
In the Line of Duty: Street War (May 11, 1992)
Yesterday Today (July 3, 1992)
In the Deep Woods (October 26, 1992)
Fatal Memories (November 9, 1992)
Revenge on the Highway (December 6, 1992)
Love Can Be Murder (December 14, 1992)
Through the Eyes of a Killer (December 15, 1992)
Amy Fisher: My Story (December 28, 1992)
Elvis and the Colonel: The Untold Story (January 10, 1993)
Darkness Before Dawn (February 15, 1993)
Miracle on Interstate 880 (February 22, 1993)
Born Too Soon (April 25, 1993)
For the Love of My Child: The Anissa Ayala Story (May 10, 1993)
In the Line of Duty: Ambush in Waco (May 23, 1993)
Without Warning: Terror in the Woods (May 26, 1993)
The Flood: Who Will Save Our Children? (October 10, 1993)
House of Secrets (November 1, 1993)
A Matter of Justice (November 7, 1993)
Fatal Deception: Mrs. Lee Harvey Oswald (November 15, 1993)
Staying Afloat (November 26, 1993)
David Copperfield (December 10, 1993)
A Perry Mason Mystery: The Case of the Wicked Wives (December 17, 1993)
Secret Sins of the Father (January 9, 1994)
Murder Between Friends (January 10, 1994)
In the Line of Duty: The Price of Vengeance (January 23, 1994)
I Know My Son Is Alive (February 20, 1994)
Stalker: Shadow of Obsession (April 10, 1994)
Search and Rescue (March 27, 1994)
Heart of a Child (May 9, 1994)
A Perry Mason Mystery: The Case of the Lethal Lifestyle (May 10, 1994)
Ray Alexander: A Taste for Justice (May 13, 1994)
Tears and Laughter: The Joan and Melissa Rivers Story (May 15, 1994)
Jonathan Stone: Threat of Innocence (May 18, 1994)
Justice in a Small Town (September 23, 1994)
A Perry Mason Mystery: The Case of the Grimacing Governor (November 9, 1994)
While Justice Sleeps (December 5, 1994)
Take Me Home Again (December 18, 1994)
In the Line of Duty: Kidnapped (March 12, 1995)
Awake to Danger (March 13, 1995)
A Perry Mason Mystery: The Case of the Jealous Jokester (April 10, 1995)
Ray Alexander: A Menu for Murder (May 20, 1995)
Problem Child 3: Junior in Love (May 13, 1995)
Beauty's Revenge (September 25, 1995)
In the Line of Duty: Hunt for Justice (October 1, 1995)
Terror in the Shadows (October 16, 1995)
Her Hidden Truth (November 12, 1995)
Visitors of the Night (November 27, 1995)
Deadly Family Secrets (December 4, 1995)
Gridlock (January 14, 1996)
The Babysitter's Seduction (January 22, 1996)
In the Line of Duty: Smoke Jumpers (February 11, 1996)
A Friend's Betrayal (May 19, 1996)
Abducted: A Father's Love (May 31, 1996)
Remembrance (September 2, 1996)
What Kind of Mother Are You? (November 18, 1996)
In the Line of Duty: Blaze of Glory (January 5, 1997)
NightScream (April 14, 1997)
On the Edge of Innocence (April 20, 1997)
Perfect Body (September 8, 1997)
Silencing Mary (March 8, 1998)
Brave New World (April 19, 1998)
The Tempest (December 13, 1998)
Vanished Without a Trace (February 1, 1999)
The Jesse Ventura Story (May 23, 1999)
Mr. Rock 'n' Roll: The Alan Freed Story (October 31, 1999)
The Magical Legend of the Leprechauns (November 7, 1999)
Little Richard (February 20, 2000)
Dying to Dance (August 12, 2001)
Carrie (November 4, 2002)
It's a Very Merry Muppet Christmas Movie (November 29, 2002)
Martha, Inc.: The Story of Martha Stewart (May 19, 2003)

See also
List of programs broadcast by NBC

References

 
NBC